"Joining You" is a song by Canadian singer-songwriter Alanis Morissette from her fourth studio album, Supposed Former Infatuation Junkie (1998). It was released as the album's second single on January 3, 1999. The song distinctly is composed of a verse and chorus in two distantly related keys: C minor and E minor, respectively. "Joining You" peaked at number 16 on the US Billboard Modern Rock Tracks chart.

Music video
Footage was shot for a video, but a completed video was never released as Morissette felt the visuals did not work with the song. A clip from one of the treatments for the footage was later released on the DVD included on the limited edition of Morissette's compilation album, The Collection (2005).

Track listings
CD1
 "Joining You" (Melancholy mix) – 4:24
 "Joining You" (album version) – 4:24
 "These Are the Thoughts" (non-album track) – 3:16
 "Thank U" (BBC/Radio One live) – 4:13

CD2
 "Joining You" (album version)
 "Your House" (BBC/Radio One live)
 "London" (Bridge School Benefit live) [non-album track]

German CD single
 "Joining You" (Melancholy mix) – 4:24
 "These Are the Thoughts" (non-album track) – 3:15
 "Thank U" (BBC/Radio One live) – 4:13

Charts

Release history

References

1998 songs
1999 singles
Alanis Morissette songs
Maverick Records singles
Song recordings produced by Glen Ballard
Songs about suicide
Songs written by Alanis Morissette
Songs written by Glen Ballard